The Red Awn is a 2007 Chinese film directed Cai Shangjun. It premiered at the 2007 Pusan International Film Festival where it won the FIPRESCI Prize. The film tells the story of a father and son in China's interior Gansu province. It won the Golden Alexander, the top award at the International Thessaloniki Film Festival.

Cast 
Yao Anlian as Song, a man who returns to his hometown after five years only to discover that his family has declared him dead.
Lu Yulai as Yongtao, Song's 17-year-old son.
Shi Junhui as Yongshan, Song's friend and the owner of the titular (in the original Chinese) red combine harvester.
Huang Lu

Reception 
The Red Awn found success on the international film festival circuit early on. Besides winning the FIPRESCI Prize at Pusan, The Red Awn was an official selection of the 2007 International Thessaloniki Film Festival where it premiered on November 24, 2007. It went on to win the Golden Alexander, the festival's top prize along with a €37,000 monetary award.

On November 11, 2008, the film won the Jury Grand Prize in the 2008 Asia Pacific Screen Awards.

Awards and nominations
 2007 International Thessaloniki Film Festival
 Golden Alexander
 2007 Pusan International Film Festival
 FIPRESCI Prize
 2008 Asia Pacific Screen Awards
 Jury Grand Prize (shared with The Prisoner)

Notes

External links 
 
 
 The Red Awn at the Chinese Movie Database
 The Red Awn, a review from FIPRESCI

2007 films
Chinese drama films
Films directed by Cai Shangjun
2007 drama films
2000s Mandarin-language films
2007 directorial debut films